Jonathan Neil Reynolds (born 28 August 1980) is a British politician. He has served as Shadow Secretary of State for Business and Industrial Strategy since 2021. A member of the Labour and Co-operative parties, he has been Member of Parliament (MP) for Stalybridge and Hyde since 2010.

Reynolds served as Parliamentary Private Secretary to the Leader of the Opposition and a Shadow Energy and Climate Change Minister from 2013 to 2015. He was a Shadow Transport Minister from 2015 to 2016 and a Shadow Treasury Minister from 2016 until 2020. He was Shadow Secretary of State for Work and Pensions from 2020 to 2021, and has been a front bench representative on the Labour National Executive Committee since 2020.

Early life and career
Born in Houghton-le-Spring, Tyne and Wear to Keith and Judith Reynolds, Jonathan Reynolds moved to Manchester in 1998. Reynolds studied Politics and Modern History at the University of Manchester and BPP Law School (Manchester). After leaving university Reynolds worked for the council and (former MP) James Purnell, before beginning training as a solicitor.

In 2007, Reynolds was elected to Tameside Council for the ward of Longdendale.

Reynolds served on Labour's National Executive Committee from 2003 to 2005.

Reynolds worked for four years as a political assistant for the previous Stalybridge and Hyde MP James Purnell and was selected to replace Purnell after a controversial selection process.

Reynolds is a member of the Co-operative Party and Unite the Union.

Parliamentary career
In the General Election of May 2010, Reynolds was elected as MP for Stalybridge and Hyde. In 2011 Reynolds stood down as councillor, the candidacy was taken up by Gill Peet who was elected in his place. During this year Reynolds did not claim Councillor Allowances.

Under Ed Miliband, Reynolds was appointed Shadow Justice and Constitutional Affairs Whip. He was later appointed Miliband's Parliamentary Private Secretary and Shadow Minister for Energy and Climate Change. As Shadow Energy Minister, he focused on fuel poverty, energy efficiency, and solar energy.

After Jeremy Corbyn was elected to the leadership of the Labour Party in September 2015, Reynolds was made a Shadow Minister for Transport with responsibility for rail. He resigned the position following Jeremy Corbyn's January 2016 reshuffle, saying he felt he could "best serve the party as a backbencher" and expressing his support for the sacked Pat McFadden. He supported Owen Smith in the 2016 Labour leadership election. Following the re-election of Jeremy Corbyn as leader of the Labour Party, he was re-appointed to the shadow front bench as Shadow City Minister.

Reynolds was appointed a member of the BIS Select Committee in 2016. He questioned Mike Ashley during the committee's inquiry into working practices at Sports Direct. Reynolds is the Vice-Chair of the All-Party Parliamentary Manufacturing Group, Vice-Chair of the All-Party Parliamentary Group on Autism, and former Secretary of the All-Party Parliamentary Group for the Armed Forces.

Reynolds is Chair of Christians on the Left and a vice-chair of Labour Friends of Israel. Between January and December 2018, Reynolds claimed £217,837 in expenses, comprising £140,296 on staffing, £5,291 on travel, £34,146 on accommodation, and £35,205 on office costs.

Views
Reynolds previously argued the Labour Party had not developed a credible "alternative economic model". He has argued in favour of an industrial policy and reforms to UK equity markets.

In his time as Shadow City Minister, he has spoken in support of a Brexit deal which is favourable to financial services. City A.M. Editor Christian May described him in November 2016 as "popular in the Square Mile and at home in the brief".

Reynolds is an advocate of proportional representation. In December 2015, he introduced a Private Member's Bill which would have changed UK general elections from the First Past the Post system, to the Additional Member System.

Reynolds supports the idea of a universal basic income and the nationalisation of the UK rail networks.

Reynolds has described himself as on the "moderate" wing of the Labour Party.

Constituency
Reynolds has campaigned for the redevelopment of local town centres, particularly Stalybridge; improved transport links, including the Mottram-Tintwistle Bypass, the proposed Transpennine Tunnel, and Northern Hub improvement; for more primary school places in Hyde; and for further devolution to Greater Manchester.

He has opposed cuts to police and fire services in Tameside and Greater Manchester and worked to improve local health services, including publicly calling for the resignation of Tameside Hospital's Chief Executive, Christine Green, in 2013.

Personal life
Reynolds lives in Stalybridge. He and his wife Claire have four children, of whom his eldest son is autistic. Outside politics, his interests include supporting Sunderland A.F.C., films and gardening.

Notes

References

External links

Jonathan Reynolds MP official constituency website

Living people
Alumni of the University of Manchester
Labour Co-operative MPs for English constituencies
UK MPs 2010–2015
UK MPs 2015–2017
UK MPs 2017–2019
UK MPs 2019–present
Politicians from Manchester
Members of the Parliament of the United Kingdom for Stalybridge and Hyde
Labour Friends of Israel
1980 births